Cat paradox may refer to
 Buttered cat paradox
 Falling cat problem
 Schrödinger's cat